Lei Yongchi (Chinese: 雷永驰; born 2 January 1989 in Shenyang) is a Chinese football player who currently plays for Heilongjiang Ice City in the China League One.

Club career
In 2007, Lei Yongchi started his professional footballer career with Shenzhen Ruby in the Chinese Super League. He would eventually make his league debut for Shenzhen on 3 March 2007 in a game against Shaanxi Chanba.
In January 2010, Lei transferred to China League One side Chengdu Blades. 
In January 2012, Lei transferred to China League One side Shenyang Zhongze. 
On 21 January 2015, Lei transferred to Chinese Super League side Henan Jianye.
On 26 February 2016, Lei transferred to fellow Chinese Super League side Liaoning Whowin.

On 26 January 2017, Lei moved to Super League side Tianjin Teda. On 28 February 2018, Lei was loaned to Liaoning Whowin. He would return to Tianjin where he stayed for one more season before joining Zhejiang Yiteng in the third tier.

Career statistics 
Statistics accurate as of match played 31 December 2020.

References

External links
 

1989 births
Living people
Chinese footballers
Footballers from Shenyang
Shenzhen F.C. players
Chengdu Tiancheng F.C. players
Henan Songshan Longmen F.C. players
Liaoning F.C. players
Tianjin Jinmen Tiger F.C. players
Chinese Super League players
China League One players
Association football forwards